Nam Tok Sai Yok Noi railway halt is a railway halt located in a small town of Nam Tok Sai Yok Noi in Sai Yok District, Kanchanaburi Province. The station is built to promote tourism only where the nearest popular destination is the Sai Yok Noi Waterfall. Most trains terminate at Nam Tok railway station located 1.4 km away from the station. As Sai Yok Noi is a single-platform terminus with no run-round loop, the line is only used by diesel multiple units.

History
Originally, the line continues to Thanbyuzayat in Myanmar which was built by the prisoners of war during World War II. After the war, most of the railway was dismantled, leaving Nam Tok at the terminus. On 12 May 1995, the section between Nam Tok and Nam Tok Sai Yok Noi was reopened for easier access to the nearby Sai Yok waterfall.

Services
The only services to use the extension are trains 909/910 which run an excursion to the waterfall from Bangkok each Saturday and Sunday.

Gallery

See also
 Hellfire Pass

References

Railway stations in Thailand
Buildings and structures in Kanchanaburi province
Burma Railway
Railway stations opened in 1995